The M32R is a 32-bit RISC instruction set architecture (ISA) developed by Mitsubishi Electric for embedded microprocessors and microcontrollers. The ISA is now owned by Renesas Electronics Corporation, and the company designs and fabricates M32R implementations. M32R processors are used in embedded systems such as Engine Control Units, digital cameras and PDAs. The ISA was supported by Linux and the GNU Compiler Collection but was dropped in Linux kernel version 4.16.

References

External links
 M32R homepage
 Linux/M32R homepage
 Interface (CQ Publishing Co.,Ltd.)

Computer-related introductions in 1997
Instruction set architectures
Renesas microcontrollers